Colotis dissociatus is a butterfly in the family Pieridae. It is found in the Tanzania, Malawi, southern and eastern Zambia, northern Mozambique, Zimbabwe and Botswana. The habitat consists of dry savanna and moister savanna.

The larvae feed on Capparis species.

References

Butterflies described in 1897
dissociatus
Butterflies of Africa
Taxa named by Arthur Gardiner Butler